Glen Tait is a Canadian politician, who was elected to the Legislative Assembly of New Brunswick in the 2010 provincial election. He represented the electoral district of Saint John East as a member of the Progressive Conservatives until the 2014 provincial election, when he did not run for reelection to another term in office.

Tait is a former Saint John City Councillor.

References

Living people
Progressive Conservative Party of New Brunswick MLAs
Saint John, New Brunswick city councillors
21st-century Canadian politicians
Year of birth missing (living people)